Harwood is an unincorporated community in Yakima County, Washington, United States, located immediately west of Yakima.

References

Unincorporated communities in Yakima County, Washington
Unincorporated communities in Washington (state)